How a Woman Becomes a Lake is a 2020 novel by Marjorie Celona.

Set in the small fishing town of Whale Bay, it deals with childhood, familial bonds, new beginnings, and costly mistakes.

The novel was a shortlisted finalist for the Crime Writers of Canada Award for Best Novel in 2021.

References

2020 Canadian novels
Hamish Hamilton books